Maskaheros is a genus of cichlids fish found on Atlantic slope of southern Mexico and Guatemala in the Coatzacoalcos and Usumacinta River drainages. They are relatively large, high-bodied cichlids and were formerly included in the genus Paraneetroplus or Vieja.

Species
There are currently 2 recognized species in this genus:

 Maskaheros argenteus (Allgayer, 1991) (White cichlid)
 Maskaheros regani (R. R. Miller, 1974) (Almoloya cichlid)

References

Heroini
Cichlid genera